Kostychany is a commune in Chernivtsi Raion, Chernivtsi Oblast (province) of western Ukraine. The commune is composed of three villages: Dumeny (Думени; Dumeni), Kostychany and Novoivankivtsi (Новоіванківці; Vancicăuții Mici). It belongs to Vanchykivtsi rural hromada, one of the hromadas of Ukraine.

Until 18 July 2020, Kostychany belonged to Novoselytsia Raion. The raion was abolished in July 2020 as part of the administrative reform of Ukraine, which reduced the number of raions of Chernivtsi Oblast to three. The area of Novoselytsia Raion was split between Chernivtsi and Dnistrovskyi Raions, with Kostychany being transferred to Chernivtsi Raion.

Kostychany village is first officially attested in a document dated 1619.

Notable people
 Ion Vatamanu

References

External links

 Kostychany  
Panoramio

Villages in Chernivtsi Raion
Populated places on the Prut
Khotinsky Uyezd
Shtetls